Qureshi is a widely distributed surname in the Muslim world.

Following is a list of notable people and fictional characters with the surname Qureshi.

Abdul Najeeb Qureshi (born 1988), Indian sprinter from Hyderabad
Abdullah Qureshi (activist) (born 1935), Pakistani activist
Abdul Subhan Qureshi, or Abdus Subhan (born 1972), fugitive from India wanted on terrorism charges
Abu Ibrahim al-Hashimi al-Qurashi (1976–2022), leader of the Islamic State of Iraq and the Levant
Ahsaan Qureshi, Indian stand-up comedian
Aisam-ul-Haq Qureshi (born 1980), Pakistani professional tennis player
Akhlaq Qureshi (born 1962), Italian Pakistani cricketer
Amir Qureshi (born 1974), Pakistani football player
Amjad Qureshi (born 1895), Pakistani cricket umpire
Asad Qureshi, British Pakistani filmmaker
Ayessha Quraishi (born 1970), Pakistani artist
Aziz Qureshi (born 1940), 15th Governor of Mizoram, India
Bashir Ahmed Qureshi (born 1959), Sindhi nationalist from Pakistan
Dulari Qureshi (born 1950), Indian art historian
Faisal Qureshi (television personality), Pakistani TV director
Faysal Qureshi (actor) (born 1973), Pakistani actor
Fazal Ali Qureshi (died 1935), Islamic scholar and Naqshbandi sheikh from British India
Fazal Qureshi (born 1961), Indian tabla player
Ferdous Ahmed Qureshi (1941–2020), Bangladeshi politician and chairman of the Progressive Democratic Party
Ghulam Samdani Qureshi (1929–1991), Bangladeshi poet and writer
Habibullah Qurayshi (1865–1943), Bengali Islamic scholar 
Haider Qureshi (born 1953), Pakistani Urdu poet
Hashim Qureshi (born 1953), Kashmiri separatist leader from India
Huma Qureshi (born 1986), Indian actress and model
Huma Qureshi (journalist), British Pakistani freelance journalist
Iqbal Hussain Qureshi (born 1937), Pakistani nuclear chemist
Ishtiaq Hussain Qureshi (born 1903), Pakistani historian and scholar
Ismail Qureshi al Hashmi (born 1260), Islamic preacher based in medieval India
Javed Qureshi (born 1961), Pakistani cricketer
Jazib Qureshi (born 1940), Urdu poet
Kamal Qureshi (born 1970), Danish Pakistani politician
Kamran Qureshi (born 1975), British filmmaker
Khalil Qureshi, Pakistani physical chemist
M. Shahid Qureshi, Pakistani astrophysicist
Mazhar Mahmood Qurashi, or Mazhar Mahmood Qureshi (born 1925), Pakistani physicist
Michael Qureshi (born 1976), Danish journalist
Moeenuddin Ahmad Qureshi (born 1930), Pakistani economist and political figure
Mohammad Shafi Qureshi (born 1929), Muslim politician from India
Muhammad Hafeez Qureshi (born 1930), Pakistani nuclear scientist and mechanical engineer
Muhammad Hanif Qureshi, Pakistani artist
Muhammad Muzammil Qureshi (born 1979), Pakistani politician
Murad Qureshi (born 1965), British-Bangladeshi politician
Mustafa Qureshi (born 1937), film and television actor
Nabeel Qureshi (author) (born 1983) American author, speaker and Christian apologist
Nabeel Qureshi (director) (born 1985), Pakistani film, television, and music video director
Parvaiz Mehdi Qureshi (born 1943), Pakistan Air Force officer
Pernia Qureshi, Indian Pashtun style icon and fashion entrepreneur
Rafat Saeed Qureshi, Indian Urdu writer
Rashid Qureshi, Pakistan Army general
Reshma Qureshi, Indian model and vlogger
Robina Qureshi (born 1964), Scottish human rights campaigner
Sadiq Hussain Qureshi (born 1927), Pakistani politician who served as both Governor and Chief Minister of Punjab Province
Safi Qureshey, or Safi Qureshi, American Pakistani entrepreneur
Sajid Qureshi (died 2013), Pakistani politician
Sajjad Hussain Qureshi (born 1897), 15th Governor of Punjab Province, Pakistan
Saqib Saleem, or Saqib Saleem Qureshi (born 1988), Indian film actor and model
Shah Abdul Majid Qureshi (1915–2003), Bangladeshi restaurateur and social reformer
Shah Mehmood Qureshi (born 1956), Pakistani politician, agriculturist, and parliamentarian
Shahid Ul Haq Qureshi (1945–unknown), Pakistani electrical engineer
Subhan Qureshi (born 1959), biologist from Khyber Pakhtunkhwa, Pakistan
Talal Qureshi, Pakistani DJ
Taufiq Qureshi (born 1962), Indian classical musician
Uzair Qureshi (born 1993), English cricketer
Waheed Qureshi (born 1925), Pakistani linguist
Yasmin Qureshi (born 1963), British Labour Party politician and barrister
Zakir Qureshi (born 1967), Pakistani television chef

Others
Aki Nawaz, or Haq Nawaz Qureshi, British singer
Alla Rakha, or Ustad Allarakha Qureshi (born 1919), Indian tabla player

See also
 Meta Qureshi, a Muslim community from Gujarat, India and Sindh, Pakistan
 Kureishi, surname

Arabic-language surnames
Lists of people by surname